Siseh Garag-e Sofla (also Romanized as Sīseh Garag-e Soflá; also known as Sīseh Garag-e Pā’īn) is a village in Sepidar Rural District, in the Central District of Boyer-Ahmad County, Kohgiluyeh and Boyer-Ahmad Province, Iran. At the 2006 census, its population was 208, in 42 families.

References 

Populated places in Boyer-Ahmad County